Helfant is a surname meaning "elephant" in the Yiddish language. Notable people with the surname include:

 Adam Helfant, sports executive 
 Edwin Helfant (1926–1978), American lawyer

See also
 Gelfond
 Gelfand
 Helfand

Yiddish-language surnames